Mordellistena aspersa is a beetle in the genus Mordellistena of the family Mordellidae. It was described in 1846 by Frederick Valentine Melsheimer.

References

aspersa
Beetles described in 1846